Sungkyunkwania is a Gram-negative, rod-shaped and non-motile genus of bacteria from the family of Flavobacteriaceae with one known species (Sungkyunkwania multivorans). Sungkyunkwania multivorans has been isolated from a seaweed farm from the South Sea from Korea. Sungkyunkwania is named after the Sungkyunkwan University.

References

Flavobacteria
Bacteria genera
Monotypic bacteria genera
Taxa described in 2013